Paatsaali School is a high school in Sanikiluaq, Nunavut, Canada. Paatsaali School opened in 2011 and has 177 students.

Next door to the school is Nuiyak School, an elementary school with 126 students from kindergarten to grade six.

References

External links
Paatsaali School

Elementary schools in Nunavut
High schools in Nunavut
Qikiqtaaluk Region
Educational institutions established in 2011
2011 establishments in Nunavut